Carlos Alfredo Feraud Silva (born October 23, 1990 in Loja) is an Ecuadorian footballer who plays for Libertad F.C. as a midfielder.

Club career

Liga de Loja

2008-2012
Feraud came out of the youth system of LDU Loja. 2012 was his best season in Loja, where he helped LDU Loja achieve 2 successive Copa Sudamericana participations for the club, their first time ever in 2012. He scored 7 goals in 51 games for LDU Loja in the 2012 season. He played five years in the club, scoring 27 goals.

Liga de Quito

2013 Season
In late 2012, he signed a five-year contract with LDU Quito starting in the 2013 season.
His official debut for LDU came in a 1-0 2013 Copa Libertadores home win against power-house Brazilian club Gremio in which Feraud scored the winning goal in the 74th minute.

Career statistics

References

External links
Play card on FEF's website 

1990 births
Living people
People from Loja, Ecuador
Association football midfielders
Ecuadorian footballers
L.D.U. Loja footballers
L.D.U. Quito footballers
S.D. Quito footballers
C.D. Cuenca footballers
C.S.D. Macará footballers
Al-Hazem F.C. players
Ecuadorian Serie A players
Saudi Professional League players
Expatriate footballers in Saudi Arabia
Ecuadorian people of French descent